Tubize may refer to:

 A.F.C. Tubize, a Belgian football club
 Tubize, a Belgian municipality
 Ateliers de Tubize, see List_of_locomotive_builders#Belgium
 Tubize 2069, a preserved steam locomotive
 Tubize 2179, a preserved narrow-gauge steam locomotive